Conus tonisii is a species of sea snail of the family Conidae. The species is predatory and venomous. They are capable of "stinging" humans.

Description
As a sea snail, Conus tonisii has a shell and lives underwater.

Distribution
This marine species can be found off the coast of Brazil.

References

 Petuch E.J. & Myers R.F. (2014). Additions to the cone shell faunas (Conidae and Conilithidae) of the Cearaian and Bahian subprovinces, Brazilian Molluscan Province. Xenophora Taxonomy. 4: 30-43

External links
 To World Register of Marine Species

tonisii
Gastropods described in 2014